The Ministry of Education (MOE) is a multiportfolio government ministry of Ghana, responsible for the governance and management of Ghana's education.  It is responsible for the national education curriculum, primarily instituted by Ghana Education Service, which is part of the Ministry.

The Ministry of Education was established under the Civil Service Law 327 and under the PNDC Law 1993 with the mandate to provide relevant education to all Ghanaians.

The Ministry's main offices are located in Accra.

Agencies 

 Ghana Education Service (GES)
 Ghana Tertiary Education Commission
 West Africa Examination Council (WAEC)
 Commission For Technical And Vocational Training (CTVET)
 Ghana Library Authority (GLA)
 Ghana Academy of Art and Science
 Funds And Procurement Management Unit
 Ghana Commission for UNESCO
 National Inspectorate Board (NIB)
National Council for Curriculum and Assessment (NaCCA)
National Teaching Council (NTC)
 Ghana Book Development Council (GBDC)

See also
Education in Ghana

References

External links
 Ministry of Education
 Ministry of Education, Science and Sports
 Ministry of Education, Science and Sports at Ministries section of Ghana.gov.gh

Education
Education in Ghana
Ghana